The Explicator is a quarterly journal of literary criticism. Current owner Routledge acquired the journal from Heldref Publications in 2009.  It mainly publishes short papers on poetry and prose. It is indexed in the Arts & Humanities Citation Index (A&HCI).  It began publication in October 1942 and is in print.

References

External links

Literary magazines published in the United States
Publications established in 1942
Quarterly journals
1942 establishments in the United States